Here and Now is the nineteenth studio album by American country music singer Kenny Chesney. It was released on May 1, 2020 via Blue Chair Records and Warner Records Nashville. The album includes the singles "Tip of My Tongue", "Here and Now", "Happy Does" and "Knowing You"

Content
Chesney announced the album's title and tracklist in March 2020. At the time of the announcement, the project had already produced two singles: "Tip of My Tongue" and the title track. The album is Chesney's second for Warner Records Nashville. Chesney co-produced the album with longtime producer Buddy Cannon. Of the songwriters chosen for the album, Chesney said that he wanted to "bring a lot of [his] favorite writers together" to tie into the album's central theme of "how different people are around the world, yet how entirely similar they can be".

Commercial performance
On the US Billboard 200, Here and Now debuted at number one, earning 233,000 equivalent album units, comprising 222,000 in album sales, and marking Chesney's 16th top 10 album, as well as the third-biggest sales week of 2020.

Track listing

Personnel
Adapted from liner notes.

Wyatt Beard - background vocals (tracks 4, 5, 7, 8, 10)
Pat Buchanan - electric guitar (tracks 1, 2, 5, 10, 12)
Tom Bukovac - acoustic guitar (track 9), electric guitar (tracks 1, 3, 5-7, 9-11)
Scooter Carusoe - background vocals (track 1)
Kenny Chesney - lead vocals (all tracks)
Ross Copperman - acoustic guitar (track 3), electric guitar (tracks 3, 9), keyboards (track 3), programming (tracks 3, 9), background vocals (tracks 3, 9)
Chad Cromwell - drums (tracks 1, 2, 4-8, 10, 11), programming (track 11), tambourine (track 8)
Fred Eltringham - drums (track 9)
David Garcia - background vocals (tracks 1, 4)
Kenny Greenberg - electric guitar (tracks 1, 2, 4-6, 8, 10, 11)
Mark Hill - bass guitar (track 9)
John Hobbs - B-3 organ (track 12), piano (track 12), synthesizer (track 12), Wurlitzer (track 12)
David Huff - programming (tracks 1, 4)
Evan Hutchings - drums (track 3)
Tony Lucido - bass guitar (tracks 1, 3)
Mac McAnally - acoustic guitar (track 12)
Carl Miner - acoustic guitar (tracks 6, 11)
David Lee Murphy - background vocals (tracks 2, 11)
Josh Osborne - background vocals (track 6)
Danny Rader - acoustic guitar (tracks 1-5, 7, 8, 11), bouzouki (tracks 3, 4, 7, 8, 11), electric guitar (tracks 2, 7), ganjo (track 4), hi-string acoustic guitar (tracks 3, 8)
Jeff Roach - keyboards (track 3)
Mike Rojas - B-3 organ (tracks 2, 4, 6, 11), piano (tracks 1, 5, 8, 10, 11), synthesizer (tracks 2, 7, 8)
Ed Sheeran - background vocals (track 9)
F. Reid Shippen - programming (tracks 3, 5, 8, 9)
Jimmie Lee Sloas - bass guitar (tracks 2, 4-8, 10, 11)
Pete Stewart - keyboards (track 9), synthesizer (track 9)
Jeff Taylor - accordion (tracks 11, 12)
Bobby Terry - steel guitar (track 5)
John Willis - acoustic guitar (track 10)
Craig Wiseman - background vocals (track 1)

Charts

Weekly charts

Year-end charts

Certifications

See also
 List of Billboard 200 number-one albums of 2020

References

2020 albums
Kenny Chesney albums
Warner Records albums
Albums produced by Buddy Cannon